Edosa is a genus of moths belonging to the family Tineidae.

Species
Edosa abathra (Meyrick, 1920)
Edosa albicapitella Gaedike, 2014
Edosa amseli (Petersen & Gaedike, 1982)
Edosa audens (Meyrick, 1921)
Edosa balanosema (Meyrick, 1893) (=Chrysoryctis heminephela Lower, 1903, Tinea plagiomochla Turner, 1926)
Edosa bicornuta (Gozmány, 2004)
Edosa caerulipennis (Erschoff, 1874) (=Edosa glossoptera Rose & Pathania, 2003, Episcardia hindostanica Zagulajev, 1966, Tineola indiella Caradja, 1920, Tinea iritis Meyrick, 1911, Euplocamus violaceus Christoph, 1888)
Edosa caradjella (Zagulajev, 1964)
Edosa citrocoma (Meyrick, 1924)
Edosa crassivalva (Gozmány, 1968)
Edosa cristata (Gozmány, 1967)
Edosa cymopelta (Meyrick, 1925)
Edosa darjeelingella (Zagulajev, 1964)
Edosa cheligera (Gozmány, 1970)
Edosa effulgens (Gozmány, 1965)
Edosa enchrista (Meyrick, 1917)
Edosa endroedyi (Gozmány, 1966)
Edosa ensigera (Gozmány, 1966)
Edosa eurycera (Diakonoff, 1968)
Edosa exhausta (Meyrick, 1917) (Sphallesthasis gracilis Gozmány, 1959 , Episcardia luteola Petersen, 1959, Sphallesthasis similis Gozmány, 1959)
Edosa fraudulens (Rosenstock, 1885)
Edosa furcata 	Gaedike, 2014
Edosa glabrella (Walker, 1863)
Edosa griseella (Robinson, 1985)
Edosa gypsoptera (Gozmány, 1968)
Edosa haplodora (Meyrick, 1917)
Edosa hemichrysella (Walker, 1866)
Edosa hemilampra (Diakonoff, 1968)
Edosa hemisema (Lower, 1903)
Edosa hypocritica (Meyrick, 1893) (=Chrysoryctis idiochroa Lower, 1918)
Edosa irruptella (Walker, 1864) (=Chrysoryctis eurybaphes Meyrick, 1893)
Edosa islamella 	Petersen & Gaedike, 1982
Edosa isocharis (Meyrick, 1930) (=Tinea anisoxantha Diakonoff, 1955)
Edosa isopela (Meyrick, 1917)
Edosa lardatella (Lederer, 1858)
Edosa leucastis (Meyrick, 1908)
Edosa liomorpha (Meyrick, 1894)
Edosa lissochlora (Meyrick, 1921)
Edosa malthacopis (Meyrick, 1936)
Edosa melanostoma (Meyrick, 1908)
Edosa meliphanes (Meyrick, 1893)
Edosa montanata (Gozmány, 1968)
Edosa namakwana  Mey, 2011
Edosa namibiae 	(Gozmány, 2004)
Edosa nesocharis (Meyrick, 1928)
Edosa nestoria (Meyrick, 1910) (=Episcardia splendens Petersen, 1973)
Edosa nigralba (Gozmány, 1968)
Edosa ochracea (Meyrick, 1893)
Edosa ochranthes (Meyrick, 1893)
Edosa opsigona (Meyrick, 1911) (=Edosa neoopsigona Rose & Pathania, 2003, Episcardia nepalensis Petersen, 1982)
Edosa oratrix (Meyrick, 1913)
Edosa orphnodes (Meyrick, 1911)
Edosa paghmanella (Petersen, 1973)
Edosa paraglossoptera Rose & Pathania, 2003
Edosa pareffulgens 	Gaedike, 2014
Edosa perinipha (Gozmány, 1968)
Edosa perseverans (Meyrick, 1926)
Edosa philbyi (Robinson, 1985)
Edosa phlegethon (Gozmány, 1968)
Edosa platyntis (Meyrick, 1894) (=Edosa sattleri Rose & Pathania, 2003)
Edosa platyphaea (Meyrick, 1926)
Edosa porphyrophaes (Turner, 1917)
Edosa powelli (Robinson, 1985)
Edosa purella (Walker, 1863)
Edosa purpurascens (Diakonoff, 1968)
Edosa pygmaeana (Petersen, 1959)
Edosa pyriata (Meyrick, 1917)
Edosa pyroceps (Gozmány, 1967)
Edosa pyrochra (Gozmány, 1965)
Edosa rhodesica (Gozmány, 1967)
Edosa robustella (Walker, 1863)
Edosa sacerdos (Walsingham, 1885)
Edosa sanctifica (Meyrick, 1921)
Edosa sinica (Gaedike, 1984)
Edosa spinosa (Gaedike, 1984)
Edosa strepsineura (Meyrick, 1926)
Edosa subochraceella (Walsingham, 1886)
Edosa synaema (Meyrick, 1905)
Edosa talantias (Meyrick, 1893)
Edosa torrifacta (Gozmány, 1965)
Edosa trita (Meyrick, 1925)
Edosa tyrannica (Meyrick, 1893)
Edosa violacella (Rebel, 1893) (=Tinea luteocapitella Amsel, 1935, Tineola fuscoviolacella Ragonot, 1895)
Edosa xerxes (Petersen & Gaedike, 1984)
Edosa xystidophora (Meyrick, 1893)

References
 De Prins, J. & De Prins, W. 2016. Afromoths, online database of Afrotropical moth species (Lepidoptera). World Wide Web electronic publication (www.afromoths.net) (acc.22-Mar-2017)

Perissomasticinae